Shellharbour is an electoral district of the Legislative Assembly in the Australian state of New South Wales. It is represented by Anna Watson who won Labor preselection after the former member Lylea McMahon decided not to contest the 2011 election.

It encompasses part of the City of Shellharbour (east of the South Coast line, as far south as Shell Cove, including Flinders, Shellharbour, Warilla, Barrack Heights, Barrack Point, Oak Flats, Mount Warrigal and Blackbutt) and the southwestern edge of the City of Wollongong (including Dapto, Kanahooka, Koonawarra, Horsley, Penrose and Yallah).

The seat was created at the 2004 redistribution of electoral districts and took in the majority of voters from the abolished Illawarra, as well as territory that previously belonged to Wollongong and Kiama.

Members for Shellharbour

Election results

References

Shellharbour
Constituencies established in 2007
2007 establishments in Australia